IAWTC can refer to:

 An abbreviated form of "I agree with this comment", used in Internet slang
 I Am The World Trade Center, a synthpop duo